The 1969 season in Swedish football, starting April 1969 and ending November 1969:

Honours

Official titles

Notes

References 
Online

 
Seasons in Swedish football